The Secret Life of Haute Couture is a TV documentary directed by Margy Kinmonth which follows her journey from Paris to New York City and California where she meets some of Haute couture clientele and the world-famous designers involved. The film was first aired on BBC Two in 2007

References 

2007 films
2007 documentary films
British documentary films
British television films
2000s English-language films
2000s British films